Coriops is a genus of prehistoric bony fish. Its fossils are found in Campanian (Mesa Verde Formation), Maastrichtian (Hell Creek Formation), and possibly Paleocene (also Hell Creek) age deposits. This chronological distribution means that the genus may have survived the Cretaceous–Paleogene extinction event that killed the dinosaurs.

Classification 
Sepkoski's compendium of marine fossil genera has it classified as an eel, but it has been classified in the Elopiformes and the Osteoglossomorpha.

See also 
 Flora and fauna of the Maastrichtian stage
 List of prehistoric bony fish

References 

Cretaceous bony fish
Prehistoric bony fish genera
Late Cretaceous fish of North America
Campanian life
Maastrichtian life
Hell Creek fauna
Danian genera